Yoon Ki-won (20 May 1987 – 6 May 2011) was a South Korean football goalkeeper, who played for Incheon United FC in the K-League.  Yoon committed suicide in May 2011.

Club career
Yoon, a draftee from the 2010 K-League draft intake, was selected by Incheon United FC for the 2010 season.  His professional debut was in an away match against Jeju United on 7 November 2010, a match in which he kept a clean sheet as well as earning a yellow card.

Yoon was the first choice keeper for Incheon at the start of the 2011 season, but by early April, a series of poor performances saw him replaced by Song Yoo-Geol. Yoon was an unused substitute for the remainder of the matches played in April.  On 6 May 2011, Yoon's body was found in his car at a rest stop along an expressway near Seoul.  He is presumed to have committed suicide.

Club career statistics

References

External links

1987 births
2011 deaths
Association football goalkeepers
South Korean footballers
Incheon United FC players
K League 1 players
Sportspeople from Busan
Ajou University alumni
Suicides by carbon monoxide poisoning in South Korea
2011 suicides